Land of Hypocrisy (translit. Ard el Nifaq) is a 1968 Egyptian comedy-drama film by Fatin Abdel Wahab, it is based on Yusuf Sibai's novel of the same name.

Cast
 Fouad El Mohandes as Masoud Abu El Saad
 Shwikar as Ilham
 Samiha Ayoub as Susu
 Hassan Mostafa as Uweiga Afandi (The manager)
 Abdelrahim El Zarakany as The shopkeeper

See also
 Cinema of Egypt
 Lists of Egyptian films
 List of Egyptian films of the 1960s
 List of Egyptian films of 1968

References

External links
 
 Land of Hypocrisy on elCinema

1960s Arabic-language films
1968 films
1968 comedy-drama films
Egyptian comedy-drama films
Films based on Egyptian novels
Egyptian black-and-white films
Films directed by Fatin Abdel Wahab
Films shot in Egypt